Suaman  is one of the constituencies represented in the Parliament of Ghana. It elects one Member of Parliament (MP) by the first past the post system of election. Suaman is located in the Aowin/Suaman district  of the Western North Region of Ghana.

Boundaries
The seat is located within the Aowin/Suaman District of the Western North Region of Ghana. It was formed prior to the 2004 December presidential and parliamentary elections by the division of the old Aowin-Suaman constituency into the new Suaman and Aowin constituencies.

Members of Parliament

Elections

See also
List of Ghana Parliament constituencies

References 

Parliamentary constituencies in the Western North Region